Partners for Justice is a 2018 South Korean television series starring Jung Jae-young and Jeong Yu-mi. The first series aired on MBC in May 2018 on Mondays and Tuesdays at 22:00 (KST) time slot. In October 2018, MBC announced that it was renewed for a second season, which premiered in 2019. Kang Seung-hyun and No Min-woo were announced as second series leads. It aired on MBC from June 3 to July 29, 2019.

Series overview

Synopsis
About a forensic doctor, Baek Beom, who is skillful at his work but has eccentric personality and prosecutor, Eun Sol, who is a rookie prosecutor with a warm heart. She has a bright personality and comes from a wealthy family background. They come to work together to solve cases.

Cast

Character appearances

Main

 Jung Jae-young as Baek Beom
 A forensic doctor with ten years of experience at the National Forensic Service. Although his skills are recognized, he is eccentric and has a picky personality.
 Jeong Yu-mi as Eun Sol
 A rookie prosecutor working in the 8th Eastern District. She was born into a wealthy family and possesses photographic memory. She is bright and warm-hearted, albeit a little clumsy.
 Park Eun-seok as Kang Hyun
An elite prosecutor who is Eun Sol's Senior.
 Oh Man-seok as Do Ji-han
 A chief prosecutor who newly transfers to the 8th Eastern District replacing Kang Hyun. He is experienced and clever.
 No Min-woo as Jang Chul / Dr. K (season 2)
 He is a warm but quiet doctor who works at Hanju Hospital. He has a Dissociative identity disorder (DID), his another identity is called Dr. K.

Supporting

People of National Forensic Service (NIS) 
 Stephanie Lee as Stella Hwang (season 1)
 A researcher and toxicologist at the National Forensic Service.
 Kang Seung-hyun as Sally (season 2)
 A new toxicologist at the National Forensic Service who replacing Stella.
 Ko Kyu-pil as Jung Sung-joo
 Forensic Investigator
  as Han Soo-yeon
 Forensic Investigator
 Joo Jin-mo as Park Joong-ho 
 Director of the National Institute of Forensic Sciences
  as Ma No-dam
 Director of the Forensic Investigation Division

People of Seoul Eastern District Prosecutors' Office 
 Park Jun-gyu as Kang Dong-sik
 A sixth-grade civil servant. He used to be a violent crime detective for 15 years.
 Park Hee-jin as Cheon Mi-ho
 An administrative assistant of Seoul Eastern District Prosecutors' Office.
  as Yang Soo-dong
 An Investigator who works with Do Ji-han.
 Ahn Suk-hwan as No Han-shin
 Chief Prosecutor of the criminal department of the Seoul Eastern District Prosecutors' Office.
 Kim Ho-jung as Oh Hwa-soo
 Chief Judge of the Seoul Eastern District Court.
 Kim Min-ha as Park Mi-young
 A prosecutor at Kang Hyun's office
  as Seo Jung-min 
 An Investigator who works with Kang Hyun.

People around Eun Sol 
  as Eun Ki-sang
 Eun Sol's father
  as Han Mi-mo
 Eun Sol's mother
 Kang Sun-sook as Byeolgyo woman (벌교댁)
 Eun Sol's housekeeper
 Heo Woong as Eun Ji-sung
 Eun Sol's older brother

People around Baek Beom 
  as Baek Ho-cheol
 Baek Beom's father

Police 
 Lee Yi-kyung as Cha Soo-ho
 He is a chief detective, a Police lieutenant, from Gangdong police station's violent crimes unit.
  as Detective Park
  as Detective Kang

Others 
  as Oh Man-sang
 A criminals who committed multiple crimes
  as Yoon Tae-joon
 Oh Man-sang's lawyer
 Yoon Sa-bong as Jang Hoo-nam
 Jang Deuk-nam's older sister
 Yoo Yeon as Jo Hee-jin
 Dong-woo's aunt, Han-soo's younger brother, Gil-ja's daughter
 Go Geon-han as Kim Joon-tae
 Yeon Mi-rae's boyfriend
 Yoon Ji-min as Lee Hye-sung
 Chief of Thoracic Surgery at Seon Hospital, Jang Deuk-nam's doctor and the criminal who killed Seo Jeong-min
 Ok Ye-rin as Han Seo-hyun - Su-yeon's daughter, a victim of child abuse in kindergarten

Production
First script reading took place late March 2018 at MBC Dream Center in Ilsan, South Korea.

Original soundtrack

Series 1

Part 1

Part 2

Part 3

Part 4

Part 5

Part 6

Series 2

Part 1

Part 2

Part 3

Part 4

Part 5

Ratings
 In the tables below,  represent the lowest ratings and  represent the highest ratings.
 NR denotes that the drama did not rank in the top 20 daily programs on that date.
 TNmS stop publishing their report from June 2018.

Series 1

Series 2

Awards and nominations

Notes

References

External links
 
 Season 2 
 
 
 

MBC TV television dramas
2018 South Korean television series debuts
2018 South Korean television series endings
2019 South Korean television series debuts
2019 South Korean television series endings
Korean-language television shows
South Korean crime television series
South Korean mystery television series
Television series by HB Entertainment